Devangudi is a village near Thiruvaiyaru in Thanjavur district, in the Indian state of Tamil Nadu. The village is situated between two principal waterways of South India: the Cauveri River, two kilometers to the north, and the Kollidam River, less than one kilometer to its south. Notable places of worship of this village include a Lord Murugan temple facing west and a lord Vinayagar temple facing east. These two temples were built exactly facing each other in the early 19th century.

Villages in Thanjavur district